Oriole or Orioles may refer to:

Animals 
 Old World oriole, colorful passerine birds in the family Oriolidae
 New World oriole, a group of birds in the family Icteridae

Music
 The Orioles, an R&B and doo-wop group of the late 1940s and early 1950s
 Oriole (band), a London-based world music jazz fusion band active in the 2000s
 Oriole Records (UK), a record label
 Oriole Records (U.S.), a record label

Places

United States
 Oriole, Indiana, an unincorporated community
 Oriole, Kentucky, an unincorporated community
 Oriole, Maryland, an unincorporated community
 Oriole, Missouri, an unincorporated community

Canada
 Oriole (provincial electoral district), a provincial electoral district
 Oriole GO Station, a station in the GO Transit network located in North York, Ontario

Sports teams

United States
 Baltimore Orioles, a Major League Baseball team
 Baltimore Orioles (1882–1899), an American Association and National League baseball team from 1882 to 1899
 Baltimore Orioles (1901-02), an American League baseball team
 Baltimore Orioles (minor league), two minor league baseball teams
 Baltimore Orioles (ice hockey), a hockey team from 1932 to 1942
 Charlotte Knights, a minor league baseball team known as the Charlotte Orioles from 1976 to 1988
 Cordele Reds, a minor league baseball team known as the Americus-Cordele Orioles in 1954 and the Cordele Orioles in 1955 before folding
 Dublin Irish, a minor league baseball team known as the Dublin Orioles in 1958
 Erie Sailors, a minor league baseball team known as the Erie Orioles from 1988 to 1989
 Fitzgerald Pioneers, a minor league baseball team known as the Fitzgerald Orioles in 1957
 Gulf Coast League Orioles, a minor league baseball team
 Leesburg Athletics, a minor league baseball team known as the Leesburg Orioles from 1960 to 1961

Elsewhere
 Dominican Summer League Orioles, a Dominican minor league baseball team
 Orioles de Montréal, a Canadian junior baseball team
 West Coast Fever, formerly Perth Orioles, Western Australia's Commonwealth Bank Trophy (netball) representatives

Naval ships
 , various United States Navy ships
 , the sail training vessel of the Canadian Forces
 , a Clyde-built paddlesteamer that was requisitioned by the British Admiralty during World War I and II

Aircraft
 Curtiss Oriole, an American general-purpose biplane first flown in 1919
 Doyle O-2 Oriole, an American parasol-wing airplane first flown in 1928

Other uses
 Orioles family, a Sicilian noble family
 "Oriole" (Homeland), a 2015 episode of the TV series Homeland
 A fluorescent gel stain made by Bio-Rad for visualization and quantitation of proteins
 Oriole, a Dixon Ticonderoga pencil brand

Animal common name disambiguation pages